Railway stations in Mali include:

Maps 
 UN Map
 UN
 UNHCR Map

Cities and Towns served by rail

Existing 

  Dakar, Senegal - port
  Tambacounda, Senegal (24m)
 Goudiry (57m)
   Kidira, Senegal (35m) - Mali border.
 Kayes, Mali (20m)
 Bafoulabe (83m) - station is at Mahina
 Diamou, Mali (72m)
 Kita Mali (392m)
 Kati, Mali (439m)
  Bamako (249) - river; national capital - workshops
 Korofina (331m) - suburb
 Koulikoro (330m) - railhead and river port.

Proposed 
(proposed West Africa Regional Rail Integration - connection to either Burkina Faso or Côte d'Ivoire) 

 Bamako - national capital - major bridge over Niger River - proposed junction
 USTDA grant in 2009.

   border with Côte d'Ivoire.
  Kolondieba (316m)
  Ouangolodougou, Côte d'Ivoire (303m) - junction
  Niangoloko (303m)

 Sikasso (419m)
   border with Burkina Faso    
  Orodaro (543m)
  Banfora (303m) - junction

  Koury (354m)
  Kayan
  Bobo-Dioulasso (445m) - junction

  Segou (270m)
  Koutiala (323m)

  Mali
   border
  Kankan
  Conakry, port, Guinea 2014 

 Bale, Mali iron ore deposits

Standard Gauge 

 2001 Report 
 2010 Report 
 2017 Report

Closed

See also 

 Transport in Mali
 Railway stations in Senegal
 AfricaRail

References 

 
Railway stations
Railway stations